Alexei Yakhin (born March 26, 1984) is a Russian professional ice hockey goaltender who currently plays for Torpedo Nizhny Novgorod of the Kontinental Hockey League (KHL).

References

External links

1984 births
Living people
HC Spartak Moscow players
Russian ice hockey goaltenders
Ice hockey people from Moscow
Torpedo Nizhny Novgorod players